Cameraria marinensis is a moth of the family Gracillariidae. It is known from California, United States.

The length of the forewings is 4.5-5.5 mm.

The larvae feed on Lithocarpus densiflorus. They mine the leaves of their host plant. The mine is oblong and the epidermis is opaque yellow tan. The mines are usually restricted to one side of midrib, running parallel to it or the mines overlap the midrib at the apex. The mines are solitary and have one or two short folds.

Etymology
The specific name is derived from the type-locality (Marin County, California) and the Latin suffix -ensis (denoting place, locality).

References

Cameraria (moth)
Moths described in 1981

Moths of North America
Lepidoptera of the United States
Leaf miners
Fauna of California
Taxa named by Paul A. Opler
Taxa named by Donald R. Davis (entomologist)